Mutondo was a Nkoya kingdom in what is today Kaoma District, Zambia.

See also
Kabulwebulwe
Kahare
Momba, Zambia

References
 State penetration and the Nkoya experience in western Zambia
 World Statesmen.org

History of Zambia